Sähkö Recordings is a Finnish independent record label, based in Turku, Finland. Sähkö ("electricity" in Finnish) was founded by Tommi Grönlund in 1993. The label gained international acclaim by its minimalist electronic releases. Sähkö Recordings has also such sublabels as Puu, Keys of Life and Jazzpuu. Sähkö and its sublabels have released records among all such Finnish artists as Ø (a.k.a. Mika Vainio), Pan sonic, Jimi Tenor and Freestyle Man (a.k.a. Sasse Lindblad). Further releases are by Miss Kitten, Martin Rev, Uwe Schmidt, Mike Ink, MADTEO, and others. Sähkö was label of the month for Resident Advisor in June 2019.

References

External links
 Official site
 Sähkö Recordings at pHinnWeb
 

Finnish record labels
Record labels established in 1993
Electronic music record labels
Experimental music record labels